This is a list of pen names used by notable authors of written work. A pen name or nom de plume is a pseudonym adopted by an author. A pen name may be used to make the author' name more distinctive, to disguise the author's gender, to distance the author from their other works, to protect the author from retribution for their writings, to combine more than one author into a single author, or for any of a number of reasons related to the marketing or aesthetic presentation of the work. The author's name may be known only to the publisher, or may come to be common knowledge.

A – F

G – L

M – R

S – Z

See also
 List of pseudonyms
 List of pseudonyms of angling authors
 List of people who adopted matrilineal surnames

References

Pen names
Pen names